Jaron Schäfer (born July 14, 1993) is a retired German footballer.

Career

Schäfer came through 1. FC Saarbrücken's youth system, and made his debut for the club in a 3–3 draw with Borussia Dortmund II in the 3. Liga February 2013, as a substitute for Markus Pazurek. At the end of the 2013–14 season he signed for FC Homburg.

After 2,5-years with several knee injuries, Schäfer retired at the end of the 2018/19 season at the age of 25. However, he would continue training with FC 08 Homburg and also begin a dual degree in sports economics at the German University for Prevention and Health Management (DHfPG) in Saarbrücken.

References

External links

1993 births
Living people
German footballers
1. FC Saarbrücken players
FC 08 Homburg players
3. Liga players
Regionalliga players
Association football midfielders
Association football forwards